Charvet may refer to:

People

 Adèle Charvet (born 1983), French mezzo-soprano
 Anne-Marie Charvet (born 1947), a French civil servant (prefect) 
 David Charvet (born 1972), American actor born in France
 Jean-Gabriel Charvet (1750–1829), French artist and draftsman known for his scenic wallpaper designs 
 John Charvet, British political theorist and emeritus professor 
 Laurent Charvet (born 1973), French footballer

Other

Charvet, a high-end bespoke and ready-to-wear shirtmaker founded in Paris, France
 charvet, a shiny, rib weave fabric most often used for neckties named after the French shirtmaker
 The Mont Charvet (2,538 m), a mountain in the Aravis Range in Haute-Savoie, France